Starlite is an intumescent material said to be able to withstand and insulate from extreme heat. It was invented by British hairdresser and amateur chemist Maurice Ward (1933–2011) during the 1970s and 1980s, and received significant publicity after coverage of the material aired in 1990 on the BBC science and technology show Tomorrow's World. The name Starlite was coined by Ward's granddaughter Kimberly.

The American company Thermashield, LLC said it acquired the rights to Starlite in 2013 and replicated it. It is the only company to have itself publicly demonstrated the technology and have samples tested by third parties.  Thermashield's Starlite has successfully passed femtosecond laser testing at the Georgia Institute of Technology and ASTM D635-15 Standard Testing.

Properties
Live demonstrations on Tomorrow's World and BBC Radio 4 showed that an egg coated in Starlite could remain raw, and cold enough to be picked up with a bare hand, even after five minutes in the flame of an oxyacetylene blowtorch. It would also prevent a blowtorch from damaging a human hand. When heat is applied, the material chars, which creates an expanding low density carbon foam which is very thermally resistant. Even the application of a plasma torch, capable of cutting eighteen-inch thick steel plate, has little impact on Starlite. It was reported that it took nine seconds to heat a warhead to 900 °C, but a thin layer of the compound prevented the temperature from rising above 40 °C. Starlite was also claimed to have been able to withstand a laser beam that could produce a temperature of 10,000 °C.

Starlite reacts more efficiently as more heat is applied. The MOD's report, as published in Jane's International Defence Review 4/1993, speculated this was due to particle scatter of an ablative layer, thereby increasing the reflective properties of the compound. Testing continues for thermal conductivity and capacity under different conditions. Contamination with dust residue may occur, and so show degradation with use. Keith Lewis, a retired MOD officer, noted that the material only guards against thermal damage and not the physical damage caused by an explosion, which can destroy the insulating layer.

Materials scientist Mark Miodownik described Starlite as a type of intumescent paint, and one of the materials he would most like to see for himself. He also admitted some doubt about the commercial potential of Starlite. Its main use appears to be as a flame retardant. Testing of modern composite materials enhanced with Starlite could expand the range of potential uses and applications of this substance.

Composition
Starlite's composition is a closely guarded secret. "The actual composition of Starlite is known only to Maurice and one or two members of his family," former Chief Scientific Adviser to the Ministry of Defence Sir Ronald Mason averred. It is said to contain a variety of organic polymers and co-polymers with both organic and inorganic additives, including borates and small quantities of ceramics and other special barrier ingredients—up to 21 in all. Perhaps uniquely for a material said to be thermal proof, it is said to be not entirely inorganic but up to 90 percent organic. Nicola McDermott, Ward's youngest daughter, stated that Starlite is 'natural' and edible, and that it has been fed to dogs and horses without ill effects.

The American company Thermashield, LLC, which owns the Starlite formula, stated in a radio interview that Starlite is not made from household ingredients and there is no PVA glue, baking soda or baking powder in it.

Commercialisation
Ward allowed various organisations such as the Atomic Weapons Establishment and ICI to conduct tests on samples, but did not permit them to retain samples for fear of reverse engineering. Ward maintained that his invention was worth billions. Sir Ronald Mason told a reporter in 1993, "I started this path with Maurice very sceptical. I’m totally convinced of the reality of the claims." He further states, "We don't still quite understand how it works, but that it works is undoubtedly the case."

NASA became involved in Starlite in 1994, and NASA engineer Rosendo 'Rudy' Naranjo talked about its potential in a Dateline NBC report. The Dateline reporter stated that Starlite could perhaps help with the fragile Space Shuttle heat shield. Naranjo said of their discussions with Ward, "We have done a lot of evaluation and … we know all the tremendous possibilities that this material has."

Boeing, which was the main contractor for the Space Shuttles in 1994, became interested in the potential of Starlite to eliminate flammable materials in their jets.

By the time of Ward's death in 2011 there appeared to have been no commercialisation of Starlite, and the formulation of the material had not been released to the public.
According to a 2016 broadcast of the BBC programme The Naked Scientists, Ward took his secrets with him when he died.
According to a 2020 BBC Online release in the BBC Reel category, Thermashield, LLC had purchased all of Ward's notes, equipment and other related materials and is working towards a viable commercial product.

Replication
A YouTube user, NightHawkInLight, attempted in 2018 to create materials that replicated the properties of Starlite. Observing that the mechanism that generates an expanding carbon foam in Starlite is similar to black snake fireworks, NightHawkInLight concocted a formula using cornstarch, baking soda, and PVA glue. After drying, the hardened material creates a thin layer of carbon foam on the surface when exposed to high heat, insulating the material from further heat transfer. He later improved it by taking out the PVA glue and baking soda, and adding in flour, sugar and borax. Using borax and flour makes it less expensive, mold and insect resistant, and allows it to work when dry.

Several experiments testing the replication and variant recipes show that they can handle lasers, thermite, torches, etc. But the replication recipe failed when it was used to make a crucible for an induction furnace.

See also
 Lost inventions
 Firepaste

References

External links
 .
 .
 . (Wayback Machine; March 9, 2020)
 
 .
 .
 .
 

Organic polymers
Biomaterials
Brand name materials
Lost inventions
Firestops